Raccordo autostradale 13 (RA 13) is a motorway which connects the Autostrada A4 with the highway SS 202 for the port of Trieste near the hamlet of Cattinara of the Julian capital and it is part of the so-called Grande Viabilità Triestina.

References 

RA13
Transport in Friuli-Venezia Giulia